Maleku may refer to:
the Maleku people
the Maleku language